Iveta Bartošová (8 April 1966 – 29 April 2014) was a Czech singer, actress and celebrity, three-time best female vocalist in the music poll Zlatý slavík (1986, 1990 and 1991). She was also known for her turbulent lifestyle attracting the attention of the Czech tabloid media.

Biography and career 
Bartošová was born in Čeladná and spent her childhood and adolescence in Frenštát pod Radhoštěm. She has an older brother Lumír and twin sister Ivana. She started her musical career in 1982, with the band Dianthus. In 1983, she succeeded in a music competition held in Jihlava and met the singer Petr Sepéši, with whom she later collaborated and started a relationship. Sepéši died in a car accident in 1985.

In the second half of the 1980s, she began collaborating with notable exponents of Czech pop music, such as František Janeček and Ladislav Štaidl, her life partner for many years. In 1987, she released her first solo album I.B., for which she received an award from her record label, Supraphon.

In 1993, she starred in the comedy Svatba upírů. In 1996, she gave birth to a son. A year later, she appeared in her first musical production, Dracula. In the late 1990s, she released several successful albums, such as Ve jménu lásky and Bílý kámen. With the start of the new millennium, her popularity decreased, partly due to scandals surrounding her personal life. In 2006, she announced a 'creative break'. She spent part of 2007 in a psychiatric hospital in Kroměříž, where she was treated for addiction to antidepressants and alcohol.

In 2008, EMI released a 3–CD compilation of her greatest hits, called Platinum Collection. In 2009, she won the TV poll in the TýTý Awards. Since October 2012, she appeared in a reality show about her life, broadcast by the tabloid TV channel Pětka. She was hospitalized again in 2013, in Bohnice Psychiatric Hospital, in association with alcohol dependence.

From 2008 to 2009, she was married to the actor and film producer Jiří Pomeje, her second husband was Josef Rychtář (from 2013 to her death in 2014). She had one son, Artur, from her relationship with Ladislav Štaidl.

Death 

On 29 April 2014, she committed suicide by throwing herself under a train in Uhříněves, Prague. Some fellow musicians pointed out that the hunt of the tabloid media against the singer had its share of tragedy. "Blame it on the media hyenas", her husband commented shortly before he collapsed and was hospitalized.

Bartošová and the tabloid media 
Iveta Bartošová was one of the most-discussed personalities in the Czech tabloid media. According to the musical producer Oldřich Lichtenberg, she "has become a victim of people who surrounded her and only try to profit from her". On the other hand, the psychologist Jeroným Klimeš pointed out in the Slovak newspaper SME that Bartošová knowingly and voluntarily participated in the media circus concerning her personal life. "She plays the story with all of us, however, she doesn't have the performance under control", he said. In the article Milý národe, Iveta Bartošová není věc (Dear Nation, Iveta Bartošová Is Not a Thing), published by the newspaper Lidové noviny, journalist Tomáš Baldýnský noted that the Czech tabloid media changes a human being into a human 'thing' and compared the public attention to the Bartošová troubles to a vulture watching her dying with a grin. In 2013 Pavel Novotný, the chief editor of the website Extra.cz and a well known tabloid journalist, remarked "Of course, we will kill her. But she's killing herself as well ... It is a fact that we've parasitized her for years ...". Novotný stated that the public demand is so huge that even the people who don't read tabloids search and read articles about her: "In such a case, there are no borders and we will parasitize her until the end and even half a year after that. It's hard and morally wrong but that's how it is." In July 2013, when she was hospitalized, 745,000 people (7% of the Czech population) watched the "Night News" special about her.

Discography 

Studio albums
1987: I.B.
1989: Blízko nás
1991: Natur
1992: Václavák
1993: Tobě
1994: Malé bílé cosi1996: Čekám svůj den1998: Ve jménu lásky1999: Bílý kámen2000: Jedna jediná2003: Dráhy hvězd - All Stars Disco2008: 222021: Knoflíky Lásky - Největší Hity 1984-2012''

Portrayal in film and television
In May 2022 a three-part series named "Iveta" premiered on Voyo.cz platform. The series about the beginnings of the career of one of the most talented Czech singers Iveta Bartošová was filmed by director Michal Samir. Iveta is portrayed by Anna Fialová, Petr Sepéši is portrayed by Vojtěch Vodochodský.

References

External links 

Iveta Bartošová at Czech and Slovak Film Database 

1966 births
2014 suicides
20th-century Czech women singers
Czech film actresses
Czech musical theatre actresses
People from Frýdek-Místek District
Suicides by train
Suicides in the Czech Republic
20th-century Czech actresses
21st-century Czech actresses
Czech twins
Zlatý slavík winners
21st-century Czech women singers